Olarenwaju Ayobami Kayode (born 8 May 1993) is a Nigerian professional footballer who plays as a forward for Turkish club Ümraniyespor on loan from the  Ukrainian Premier League club Shakhtar Donetsk.

Club career

Early career
Kayode began his career with Red Bull Ghana and signed in February 2010 for ASEC Mimosas.

On 2 February 2012 Kayode left ASEC Mimosas joining Swiss club FC Luzern on loan until 30 November 2012.

Maccabi Netanya
On 10 October 2013, Kayode signed a one-year contract with Israeli club Maccabi Netanya.

Austria Wien
After another successful season with Maccabi Netanya, netting 13 goals and six assists, Kayode signed a four-year deal with FK Austria Wien. On 2 August 2015, he scored on his FK Austria Wien debut against SC Rheindorf Altach.

Manchester City
On 17 August 2017, Manchester City signed Kayode on a four-year deal and immediately loaned him out to Girona for the 2017–18 season. Kayode made his La Liga debut on 19 August 2017, replacing Portu in a 2–2 home draw against Atlético Madrid.

On 2 March 2018, Kayode was loaned to Ukrainian Premier League club Shakhtar Donetsk after his loan at Girona was terminated.

Shakhtar Donetsk
On 8 June 2018, Shakhtar Donetsk announced that following Kayode's successful loan spell they would exercise their option to sign him permanently for an undisclosed fee. Kayode signed for Shakhtar on a five-year deal.

Gaziantep (loan) 
On 9 August 2019, Kayode was loaned to Turkish Süper Lig side Gaziantep F.K.

Sivasspor (loan) 
On 17 September 2020, Kayode signed on loan to Turkish Süper Lig side Sivasspor. He scored his first Sivasspor goal on his Europa League debut for the club against Villarreal in a 5–3 away loss, and scored against Maccabi Tel Aviv in a 2–1 home loss in the following fixture.

Ümraniyespor (loan) 
Upon his return from Sivasspor, Kayode did not appear for Shakhtar in the first half of the 2022–23 season. On 30 January 2023, Kayode was loaned by Ümraniyespor until the end of the 2022–23 season.

International career
Kayode played for the Nigeria U17 national team at the 2009 FIFA U-17 World Cup. On 3 May 2010, he earned his first call-up for the Nigeria U20 team for the qualifiers to the African Youth Championship in Libya. He was called on 12 April 2011 for the 2011 African Youth Championship in South Africa. Kayode made his debut for the senior team in a 1–1 draw with Senegal on 23 March 2017.

Career statistics

Club

International

Honours
ASEC Mimosas
Ligue 1: 2010

Maccabi Netanya
Liga Leumit: 2013–14

Shakhtar Donetsk
Ukrainian Premier League: 2017–18, 2018–19
Ukrainian Cup: 2017–18, 2018–19

Sivasspor
 Turkish Cup: 2021–22

References

External links

 

1993 births
Living people
Sportspeople from Ibadan
Yoruba sportspeople
Nigerian footballers
Association football forwards
ASEC Mimosas players
Swiss Super League players
FC Luzern players
Israeli Premier League players
Maccabi Netanya F.C. players
Austrian Football Bundesliga players
FK Austria Wien players
Manchester City F.C. players
La Liga players
Girona FC players
2011 CAF U-23 Championship players
2013 African U-20 Championship players
Nigeria international footballers
Nigeria under-20 international footballers
Nigerian expatriate footballers
Nigerian expatriate sportspeople in Ivory Coast
Nigerian expatriate sportspeople in Switzerland
Nigerian expatriate sportspeople in Israel
Nigerian expatriate sportspeople in Spain
Nigerian expatriate sportspeople in Turkey
Expatriate footballers in Ivory Coast
Expatriate footballers in Switzerland
Expatriate footballers in Israel
Expatriate footballers in Austria
Expatriate footballers in Spain
Expatriate footballers in Turkey
Ukrainian Premier League players
FC Shakhtar Donetsk players
Nigerian expatriate sportspeople in Ukraine
Expatriate footballers in Ukraine
Süper Lig players
Gaziantep F.K. footballers
Sivasspor footballers
Ümraniyespor footballers